Poshteh Rizeh may refer to:
 Poshteh Rizeh-ye Sofla
 Poshteh Rizeh-ye Vosta